Jake Joseph Garrett (born 10 March 2003) is an English professional footballer who plays as a midfielder for Blackburn Rovers.

Club career
Having played for Merseyside clubs Liverpool and Everton, Garrett joined Blackburn Rovers's academy at the age of nine. He signed his first professional contract in March 2020.

Having featured for Blackburn Rovers in the 2021–22 pre-season, Garrett failed to break into the first team that year. He again featured in pre-season in July 2022, and there was interest from clubs to sign him on loan. However, he stayed with Blackburn Rovers, and made his professional debut in an EFL Cup tie against Bradford City in August 2022. He went on to make his Championship debut in October of the same year, in a 2–0 win over Sunderland.

International career
Garrett has represented England at under-15 and under-16 level.

Career statistics
.

Notes

References

Living people
2003 births
English footballers
England youth international footballers
Association football midfielders
English Football League players
Liverpool F.C. players
Everton F.C. players
Blackburn Rovers F.C. players